{{DISPLAYTITLE:C6H7N}}
The molecular formula C6H7N (molar mass: 93.12 g/mol, exact mass: 93.0578 u) may refer to:

 Aniline
 Azepine
 Methylpyridines (picolines)
 2-Methylpyridine
 3-Methylpyridine
 4-Methylpyridine